Richard Joseph Davis Jr. (August 7, 1921 – March 4, 1999) was the 34th Lieutenant Governor of Virginia from 1982 to 1986 serving under Governor Chuck Robb.  A former mayor of Portsmouth, Virginia, Davis' 1981 election as Lieutenant Governor saw him win 8 of the 10 Congressional Districts composing Virginia in 1981; his statewide margin of victory over Republican state senator Nathan H. Miller was 150,000 votes. In 1982, Davis ran for the United States Senate, but lost to Republican candidate Paul S. Trible Jr.

Davis had the distinction of being the first Catholic elected to a statewide office in Virginia history. Davis would remain the only statewide Catholic elected in Virginia history until the 2001 Virginia General Elections, when Tim Kaine was elected lieutenant governor, the same office Davis once held. Four years later, in the 2005 Virginia General elections, history was made again when Kaine won the governor's race and Bob McDonnell won the attorney general's race.  The elections of Kaine and McDonnell created a new record in Virginia history at that time: two Catholics elected to statewide offices.

While Lieutenant Governor, Davis served in the executive branch with two fellow Democrats: Attorney General Gerald Baliles, who would be elected governor in 1985; and Governor Chuck Robb, who had preceded Davis as lieutenant governor.

Davis owned the Tidewater Sharks in the Southern Hockey League from 1975 to 1977.

References 

|-

1921 births
1999 deaths
20th-century American politicians
Democratic Party of Virginia chairs
Lieutenant Governors of Virginia
Politicians from Portsmouth, Virginia
Southern Hockey League (1973–1977)
Virginia Democrats
Candidates in the 1982 United States elections